Silver oxalate is commonly employed in experimental petrology to add carbon dioxide to experiments as it will break down to silver (Ag) and carbon dioxide under geologic conditions.  It is also a precursor to the production of silver nanoparticles.
It is explosive upon heating around 140 degrees Celsius, shock or friction.

Production
Silver oxalate is produced by the reaction between silver nitrate and oxalic acid.

See also
 Dioxane tetraketone

References

External links
 Synthesizing Silver Oxalate
 Chemical Entity Data Page

Silver compounds
Oxalates